The 1968 St. Louis Cardinals season was the 49th season the team was in the National Football League (NFL). The team improved on their previous output of 6–7–1, winning nine games. Despite the improvement, they failed to qualify for the playoffs for the 20th consecutive season.

Offseason

NFL Draft

Roster

Schedule

Standings

References

External links 
 1968 St. Louis Cardinals at Pro-Football-Reference.com

1968
St. Louis Cardinals